New Ulm Municipal Airport  is a public airport located two statute miles (3 km) west of the central business district (CBD) of New Ulm, a city in Brown County, Minnesota, United States. Operational since September 1945, scheduled airline service was once available on Midwest Aviation, also known as Lake State Airways, though today only charter flights are offered by the city's New Ulm Flight Service, founded in the 1960s.

The airport is home to an annual fly-in pancake breakfast, which serves as the New Ulm Lion Club's biggest fundraiser of the year.

Facilities & Aircraft
New Ulm has two runways. Runway 15/33 is 5401 x 100 ft and is made of asphalt, while runway 4/22 is 2478 x 160 ft and is turf.

For the 12-month period ending April 30, 2018, the airport has 15,330 operations per year, or 42 per day. This includes 21% general aviation, 29% air taxi, and <1% military. For the same time period, there are 13 aircraft based on the field: 11 single-engine and 2 multi-engine airplanes.

The airport has one FBO offering fuel, a courtesy car, a crew lounge, and more.

Accidents & Incidents
On February 9, 2022, a Piper PA-46 Malibu made an emergency landing at New Ulm due to engine troubles while en route to Fargo, North Dakota. All on board were uninjured.

References

External links 

Airports in Minnesota
Buildings and structures in Brown County, Minnesota
New Ulm, Minnesota
Transportation in Brown County, Minnesota